"Papa Nero" ("Black Pope") is a song by the Venetian reggae band Pitura Freska, with lyrics in the  Venetian language.

It was performed at the 1997 Sanremo Music Festival, and became very popular throughout Italy.  It is notable for being one of the very few songs (if not the only song) in Venetian that got significant media exposure outside the Veneto region.

The lyrics are inspired on a prediction by Nostradamus that the next-to-last Pope will come from Africa. They can be read as a light-hearted anti-racist and anti-xenophobic message.  Some famous verses were:

Notes

External links 
 

1997 songs
Italian songs
Sanremo Music Festival songs